Louise Noreen McCarthy (born 18 October 1993) is an Irish cricketer who plays as a right-arm medium bowler. She made her international debut for Ireland in 2010 at the age of 16, and went on to play 28 One Day Internationals and 28 Twenty20 Internationals between 2010 and 2017. In June 2020, she was added to Ireland's training squad following a three-year absence. In July 2020, she was awarded a non-retainer contract by Cricket Ireland for the following year. She has played domestic cricket for all three of the Women's Super Series teams, as well as spending the 2019 season with Durham. She is the sister of Barry McCarthy, who played for Durham and Ireland.

References

External links

1993 births
Living people
Irish women cricketers
Ireland women One Day International cricketers
Ireland women Twenty20 International cricketers
Cricketers from County Dublin
Typhoons (women's cricket) cricketers
Dragons (women's cricket) cricketers
Scorchers (women's cricket) cricketers
Durham women cricketers